A core-based statistical area (CBSA) is a U.S. geographic area defined by the Office of Management and Budget (OMB) that consists of one or more counties (or equivalents) anchored by an urban center of at least 10,000 people plus adjacent counties that are socioeconomically tied to the urban center by commuting. Areas defined on the basis of these standards applied to the 2000 census data were announced by OMB in June 2003. These standards are used to replace the definitions of metropolitan areas that were defined in 1990. The OMB released new standards based on the 2010 census on July 15, 2015.

Definition 
The term "CBSA" refers collectively to both metropolitan statistical areas and micropolitan areas. Micropolitan areas are based on Census Bureau-defined urban clusters of at least 10,000 and fewer than 50,000 people. The map below shows the metropolitan areas (medium green) and micropolitan areas (in light green) for the CBSAs for the United States and Puerto Rico.

The basic definition of metropolitan areas has had slight changes made to it as well.  A metropolitan area, as it did in 1990, requires a Census Bureau-defined urbanized area of at least 50,000 people. A metropolitan statistical area containing an urbanized area of at least 2.5 million people can be subdivided into two or more "metropolitan divisions", provided specified criteria are met. Metropolitan divisions are conceptually similar to the primary metropolitan statistical areas (PMSAs) defined under previous standards.

By a similar token, there are now definitions for combined statistical areas (CSAs). These areas can be formed when adjoining CBSAs meet particular standards to become new areas. It does not matter which kind of areas they are;  any combination of metro and micro areas may be used to form a CSA.

Unlike in past years, the metropolitan areas in New England are currently county-based, consistent with those in the rest of the U.S. Previously, these were referred to by the Census Bureau as NECMAs (New England county metropolitan areas) and were separate from the normal census counts for the areas, which used cities and towns as their basis. They have essentially swapped places now, with the city and town areas (or NECTAs, for New England city and town areas) being the separate listings.

Despite there not being much change in the basic definition, 49 new metropolitan areas were formed as a result of the new rules for them. Over 550 other areas were classified as micropolitan. All told, the present rules have defined 935 CBSAs in the U.S. and Puerto Rico. Eleven of the CBSAs have metropolitan divisions, 29 in total. In comparison, the definition of metropolitan areas in 1999, the last year areas were formed based on the 1990 rules for them, there were 284 metropolitan areas, with 19 of the areas providing 76 primary metropolitan areas (the equivalent of divisions); almost three times the number of areas overall are now recognized by the OMB.

Map

See also

United States of America
Outline of the United States
Index of United States-related articles

Demographics of the United States
United States Census Bureau
List of U.S. states and territories by population
List of metropolitan areas of the United States
List of United States cities by population
List of United States counties and county-equivalents

United States Office of Management and Budget
Statistical area (United States)
Combined statistical area (list)
Core-based statistical area (list)
Metropolitan statistical area (list)
Micropolitan statistical area (list)

References

External links

United States Census Bureau
2010 United States Census
USCB population estimates
United States Office of Management and Budget

 
2003 establishments in the United States
Demographics of the United States
United States Census Bureau geography